The 9th Singapore Division (9 DIV) is a combined arms division of the Singapore Army. It shares the same command as the Infantry formation of the Army.

History 
The 9th Division was formed on 1 October 1978 as a reserve division to manage and train reservist units before it became a combined arms division on 31 March 1992. On 1 January 1995, the 9th Division was restructured to include both active and reservist personnel. On 17 August 2004, the 9th Division and HQ Infantry merged to form HQ 9th Singapore Division/Infantry.

References

 

Formations of the Singapore Army
Singapore Army
Military units and formations established in 1978